Maggie Cronin is an Irish actress and playwright.

The short film The Shore directed by Terry George, in which she appears with Ciarán Hinds, Conleth Hill and Kerry Condon, won the Academy award in the Short Film, Live Action category at 84th Academy Awards in February 2012.

She appeared in Doctors (BBC1 TV) from 2000–2004 playing the role of Kate McGuire for over 600 episodes. In 2006 she briefly returned when Christopher Timothy's character Brendan "Mac" McGuire left the series. She appeared in My Mother and Other Strangers and The Frankenstein Chronicles.

Background 
She trained at the Webber Douglas Academy of Dramatic Art, which was absorbed into the Central School of Speech and Drama in 2006.

Writing 
Her first one-woman show, A Most Notorious Woman directed by Paddy Scully, premiered at the Edinburgh Festival Fringe in 1989 and subsequently toured, over a number of years, through the UK, Ireland and the US, garnering much critical acclaim:

"Cronin is clearly a writer. Her play is intelligent, inventive, playful and blessed with the Irish gift for vividly descriptive language."- Damien Jaques, Milwaukee Journal Sentinel. January 1999; 
"A brave, bold, free spirited show of enormous dramatic power."- Lyn Gardner, City Limits;

"Cronin has fashioned a play that is delicate, funny and richly textured…With a few simple props – a battered suitcase, a white silk sheet which doubles as a table cloth, a wedding dress and a billowing ship’s sail – Grace’s free spirit is evoked."
– Helen Meany,

Irish Times September 1998

The script won The Stewart Parker Trust/BBC Radio Drama Award for 1995 and was published by Lagan Press in 2004.

Her second one-woman show Greenstick Boy directed by Sarah Tipple, previewed at the Brian Friel Theatre in Belfast in March 2008, and the Assembly Rooms, at the Edinburgh Festival Fringe, in August 2008. It has been performed at Belfast’s Black Box Theatre (in the Out to Lunch Festival 2010) and Bewley’s Cafe Theatre in Dublin in 2010 in the ABSOLUT Fringe festival.

"Lyrical brilliance... Maggie Cronin paints a deeply poignant picture of a wild love and the throbbing nostalgic pains that survive it.… a lesson in storytelling" **** Junta Sekimori – Fest magazine, Edinburgh.

"Beautifully written and wonderfully performed, this one-woman show was very, very good...This well structured play is funny, fresh, sad and a real delight to watch." THREE WEEKS review Edinburgh
 
"Maggie Cronin's monologue gets right under the skin of what it was like to be young in London in the days of punk and its aftermath."  Thom Dibdin, THE STAGE

She co -wrote, with actress Carol Moore, a dramatised history of the Ulster Suffragettes entitled "Shrieking Sisters"

Maggie has been performing the show, with Carol Moore and Laura Hughes, since February 2013.

Theatre and radio/audio

Selected stage credits 
Ma, "The Gift" CahootsNI Theatre Company.  Dir: Paul McEneany
Martha "The Kitchen the Bedroom And The Grave" by Donal O'Hagan. Accidental Theatre, Belfast. Dir: Richard Lavery
M, Greenstick Boy, Bozar Theatre Brussels, Bewley's Cafe Theatre Dublin for ABSOLUT Fringe 2010, Dir: Sarah Tipple
Various roles: "Shrieking Sisters" – Belfast City Hall, Island Arts Centre Lisburn,  and numerous venues.
Winnie, Happy Days, Dir: Joel Beddows
Nora Ryan, Bruised, Tinderbox, Dir: Anna Newell
Vadoma, Carnival, Kabosh, Dir: Paula McFetridge
M, Greenstick Boy, Assembly Rooms, Edinburgh Greenstick Productions, Dir: Sarah Tipple
Gin, The Trestle at Pope Lick Creek, Prime Cut Productions, Dir: Patrick O'Kane
Marie, "1974– The End Of The Year Show", The Lyric Theatre, Belfast, Dir: Carol Moore
Reta, Unless, Stephen Joseph Theatre, Scarborough, Dir: Tim Sheader
Daisy, Give Me Your Answer Do!, Belfast Lyric Theatre, Dir: Ben Twist
Joy Gresham, Shadowlands, Belfast Lyric Theatre, Dir: Zoe Seaton
Titania, A Midsummer Night's Dream, Belfast Lyric Theatre, Dir: Robin Midgley
Widow Quin, Playboy of the Western World, Belfast Lyric Theatre, Dir: David Grant

Radio 
Maire Nic Shiublaigh, THE WOMEN WHO STAGED THE RISING, BBC Radio 3, Dir: Conor Garrett
 
Therapist,  DEAR BABY MINE, BBC radio 4 Dir: Heather Larmour

Rosamond Lehmann, BOWEN AND BETJEMAN, BBC Radio 4,  Dir: Gemma McMullan

Narration, THE BOOK PROGRAMME- BANNED IRISH BOOKS, Radio 4, Dir: Regina Gallen

Narrator/ Helen Waddell, ULSTER'S FORGOTTEN DARLING, BBC Radio 4, Dir: Regina Gallen

Bridget, LOVE'S WORST DAY, BBC Radio 4, Dir: Gemma McMullan

Black/Judge,  "Kicking The Air" BBC Radio 4 Dir: Heather Larmour (Zebbie award Winner)

Bertha Mulvihill, Titanic Letters, BBC Northern Ireland/Radio 4, Dir: Ian Dougan

Narrator, The Book Programme, BBC Radio Ulster

Megan/Susan, Some Secluded Glade, BBC Radio 4, Dir: Eoin O'Callaghan

Reader, The Fairy's Curse, BBC Radio 3, Dir: Marie-Claire Doris

Judith, Girl from Mars, BBC Radio 4, Dir: Heather Larmour (Zebbie award winner)

Reader, One by One In the Darkness, BBC Radio 4, Dir: Sara Johnson

Audio/voiceover work 

Narrator, Talking to Billy, BBC NI TV, Dir: Clare Delargy

Narrator, Atlantis: The Evidence, BBC Worldwide, Dir: Detlef Siebert

Narrator, Quitting Crime, Crawford McCann for BBC NI, Dir: Kelda Crawford McCann

Narrator, The House on The Hill, Doubleband for BBC Northern Ireland, Dir: Laura Doherty

Series Narrator, The Choirboys, BBC Northern Ireland, Dir: Natalie Maynes

Series Narrator, The Last Resort, Tern TV for BBC NI, Dir: Matt Marsters

Narrator, When the Pope Came to Ireland, BBC1 NI, Dir: Tony Curry

Narrator, Show me the Mummy, BBC1 NI, Dir: Ian Dougan

Series Narrator, Life Inside, BBC1 NI, Dir: Denise O'Connor

Amelia, The Crown Jewel, BBC1 NI, Dir: Clare Delargy

Audio, Narrator, All For You by Sheila O'Flanagan, RNIB Talking Books

Audio, Narrator, Ellis Island by Kate Kerrigan, RNIB Talking Books

Audio, Narrator, Always with you by Gloria Hunniford, RNIB Talking Books

Audio, Narrator, Close to you by Gloria Hunniford, RNIB Talking Books

Audio, Narrator, Veronica Guerin: The Life and Death of a Crime Reporter, by Emily O'Reilly, RNIB Talking Books

Film 
Landlady (Mrs Thompson), SHOOTING FOR SOCRATES, New Black, James Erskine

Sinead in A Belfast Story Director: Nathan Todd

Susan in To Lose Control; Directed by Marty Stalker

Alice Weller in 2011's Whole Lotta Sole known as Stand Off in USA Directed by Terry George

Mary in The Shore, directed by Terry George. It won the Academy Award in the 'Short Film, Live Action' Category at 84th Academy Awards in February 2012.

Television

Doctors (2000–2004 and 2006) 
She is perhaps best known for her role as Practice Manager Kate McGuire in BBC One's flagship daytime serial, Doctors, produced by Mal Young.

She was a member of the original cast at the 2000 launch of the programme, and remained as a main character until her leaving on 26 May 2006. As the wife of Mac (played by Christopher Timothy, of the TV seriesAll Creatures Great and Small fame), the character was partly responsible for setting up the original practice around which the drama revolved – Riverside Surgery. As Practice Manager, she was involved regularly with the storylines of both patients and the other doctors, and is featured in the majority of the early episodes. During her time in Letherbridge, Kate endured countless trials including a miscarriage, Mac's trial for a patient's murder, an affair with a priest (played by Richard Standing), and the abduction of her and Mac's son, Ciaran.

Other work 
Sandra, A Year of Greater Love, BBC Northern Ireland, Dir: Michael McDowell, to be shown 2012

Laura Cross, Marú, Stirling Films for TG4, Dir: Lawrence Gough

Doris Curran, Scapegoat, Waddell Media/BBC NI, Dir: Michael McDowell

Emer O'Callaghan, The Clinic, RTÉ, Dir:Liam Cunningham

Bel Ferris, Holby City, BBC1 TV, Dir: James Strong

Sarah, That's Not Me, BBC NI, Dir: Peter Lawrence

Mrs McGinley, United, BBC NI, Dir: Michael McGowan (Children's BAFTA winner)

The Bill, Dir: David Attwood

References

External links
 Welcome
 Terry George celebrates Oscar
 Spotlight

Irish television actresses
Living people
Year of birth missing (living people)